is a former Japanese football player. He played for Japan national team.

Club career
Sakai was born in Misato on 29 June 1979. He joined JEF United Ichihara from youth team in 1997. He played many matches as defensive midfielder from first season. He moved to Nagoya Grampus Eight in 2001. He also played as right midfielder not only defensive midfielder. His opportunity to play decreased from the middle of 2003. He moved to Urawa Reds in 2004. Although he did not have much opportunity to play, the club won the 2nd place in 2004 and 2005 J1 League and the champions 2005 Emperor's Cup. He moved to Vissel Kobe in July 2007 and Fujieda MYFC in 2009. From 2010, he moved to Indonesia and played for Pelita Jaya, Persiwa Wamena, Persiram Raja Ampat and Deltras Sidoarjo. He retired in 2013.

National team career
In August 1995, Sakai was selected Japan U-17 national team for 1995 U-17 World Championship. He played full-time in all 3 matches. In April 1999, he was also selected Japan U-20 national team for 1999 World Youth Championship. He played full-time in all 7 matches as right midfielder and Japan won the 2nd place.

In September 2000, Sakai was selected Japan U-23 national team for 2000 Summer Olympics who carried high hopes of the nation because Sakai's teammates included such household names as Hidetoshi Nakata, Shunsuke Nakamura and Naohiro Takahara. Sakai played all 4 matches. However, in the team's quarterfinal match, Sakai committed a foul inside his own box at the 90th minute, conceding the United States, Japan's opponents, a crucial penalty to make it 2-2. The United States went on to win the penalty shootouts after 120 minutes of play could not separate the two teams.

On 20 December 2000, Sakai debuted for Japan national team against South Korea.

Club statistics

Honors and awards

Club honors
Urawa Reds
J1 League (1): 2006
Emperor's Cup (2): 2005, 2006

Country honors
 FIFA World Youth Championship runner-up: 1999

References

External links

Japan National Football Team Database

1979 births
Living people
Association football people from Saitama Prefecture
Japanese footballers
Japan international footballers
Japan youth international footballers
J1 League players
JEF United Chiba players
Nagoya Grampus players
Urawa Red Diamonds players
Vissel Kobe players
Fujieda MYFC players
Expatriate footballers in Indonesia
Liga 1 (Indonesia) players
Pelita Bandung Raya players
Footballers at the 2000 Summer Olympics
Olympic footballers of Japan
Japanese expatriate footballers
Association football midfielders